Aziz Mohammed (born 1987) is a Saudi Arabian writer. He was born in Al-Khobar. He has written in a variety of genres, including poetry, short stories and film reviews. His debut novel The Critical Case of K was nominated for the Arabic Booker Prize and has been translated into English by Humphrey Davies.

References

Saudi Arabian writers
1987 births
Living people